Bartın is a city in northern Turkey, near the Black Sea. It is the seat of Bartın Province and Bartın District. Its population is 81,692 (2021).

Formerly a district of Zonguldak Province, Bartın was made into a province seat in 1991. Bartın River is the only navigable river for vessels in Turkey.

History
The history of the antique Parthenios city (Παρθένιος in Greek), or Parthenia, dates back to 1200 BC, when its area was inhabited by the Kaskian tribe. In the following centuries, the region had entered under the dominance of Hittites, Phrygians, Cimmerians, Lydians, Greeks, and Persians. Later, it was part of the Roman Empire and then of the Byzantine Empire, until it fell to the Seljuk Turks and the Candaroğulları State between the 11th and the 13th centuries AD. Bartın was conquered by the Ottoman sultan Mehmet II in 1392. In the late 19th and early 20th century, Bartın was part of the Kastamonu Vilayet of the Ottoman Empire.

Main sights
Bartın is a member of the Norwich-based European Association of Historic Towns and Regions (EAHTR).

Main sights include the castle, two churches, bedesten, the Kuşkayası Road Monument and İnziva (seclusion) Cave in the city center. Sections of the ancient city like the forum, the council palace, the road of honor, the theatre, the acropolis, and a necropolis are now below the ground.

The wooden Bartın houses display the architectural characteristics of the art movements after the Tanzimat Fermanı (Reforms Decree).

Geography

The city of Bartın consists of 22 quarters:

 Kırtepe
 Kemerköprü
 Gölbucağı
 Orta
 Okulak
 Köyortası
 Orduyeri
 Tuna
 Demirciler
 Aladağ
 Karaköy
 Çaydüzü
 Esentepe
 Cumhuriyet
 Hürriyet
 Karaçay
 Ağdacı
 Gecen
 Gürgenpınarı
 Şiremirçavuş
 Uzunöz
 Yıldız

Climate 
Bartın has a borderline oceanic (Cfb) and humid subtropical (Cfa) climate under the Köppen classification, or an oceanic climate (Do) under the Trewartha classification.

For a long time, Bartın city center was considered to only have an oceanic climate (Cfb), with its warmest month being well below the  threshold, yet in recent decades climate change and global warming has been contributing to its classification slowly turning humid subtropical (Cfa) and therefore the city center is currently classified as borderline oceanic-humid subtropical.

Precipitation is heaviest in autumn and early winter and lightest in spring. Snowfall is somewhat common between the months of December and March, snowing for a week or two, and it can be heavy once it snows.

Culture
The city hosts strawberry festivals in spring. The city also has beaches of good quality.

References

External links

English Information of Bartın 
Bartın Şehir ve Firma Rehberi 

 
Populated places in Bartın Province
Black Sea port cities and towns in Turkey
Bartın District